The 18th Arizona State Legislature, consisting of the Arizona State Senate and the Arizona House of Representatives, was constituted in Phoenix from January 1, 1947 to December 31, 1948, during the fourth of Sidney Preston Osborn's four consecutive terms as Governor of Arizona. The number of senators and house members remained constant at 19 and 58, respectively. The Democrats controlled one hundred percent of the senate. while the Republicans gained four house seats, to a total of five.

Sessions 
The Legislature met for the regular session at the State Capitol in Phoenix on January 13, 1947; and adjourned on March 20. There were seven special sessions, the first of which was held from June 9 through June 23, 1947, the second was held from June 18 – July 1, 1947, the third was held between January 5 – 21, 1948, the fourth from January 22- February 17, 1948, the fifth spanned February 18 – March 12, 1948, The sixth was from March 12–25, 1948, and the seventh from September 13 – October 14, 1948.

State Senate

Members 

The asterisk (*) denotes members of the previous Legislature who continued in office as members of this Legislature.

House of Representatives

Members 
The asterisk (*) denotes members of the previous Legislature who continued in office as members of this Legislature.

References 

Arizona legislative sessions
1947 in Arizona
1948 in Arizona
1947 U.S. legislative sessions
1948 U.S. legislative sessions